In probability theory, the asymmetric simple exclusion process (ASEP) is an interacting particle system introduced in 1970 by Frank Spitzer. Many articles have been published on it in the physics and mathematics literature since then, and it has become a "default stochastic model for transport phenomena".

the 1s being thought of as particles and the 0s as holes. Each particle waits a random
exponent mean one amount of time and then attempts a jump, one site to the right
with probability  and one site to the left with probability . However, the jump is performed only if there is no particle at the target site. Otherwise, nothing happens and the particle waits another exponential time. All particles are doing this independently of each other.

The model is related to the Kardar–Parisi–Zhang equation in the weakly asymmetric limit, i.e. when  tends to zero under some particular scaling. Recently, progress has been made to understand the statistics of the current of particles and it appears that the Tracy–Widom distribution plays a key role.

Sources

References
.
.

Statistical mechanics